KRL Commuterline, or commonly known as Commuterline, is a commuter rail system for Greater Jakarta in Indonesia. It was previously known as KRL Jabodetabek. It is operated by PT KAI Commuter Indonesia (KAI Commuter/KCI), a subsidiary of the Indonesian national railway company PT Kereta Api Indonesia (KAI).
The rail system uses rolling stock of rapid transit standard and operates at high frequency with a minimum headway. In 2019, the average number of KRL users per day reaches average of 1.04 million, with the record of the highest number of users served in a day being 1,154,080.

"KRL" itself stands for "Kereta Rel Listrik" (literally "electric rail train" or "electric railcar"), a term for an electric multiple unit train.

History

Colonial era 
In 1917, a plan to introduce electrified railway in Batavia was made by Dutch colonial railway company Staatsspoorwegen. A railway between Tanjung Priok to Meester Cornelis (Jatinegara) was the first line to be electrified. The construction began in 1923 and completed on 24 December 1924. The line was opened on 6 April 1925—in time for the SS 50th anniversary—with 3000-series locomotives from SLM–BBC (Swiss Locomotive and Machine Works – Brown Boveri & Cie), 3100-series electric locomotives from AEG Germany, 3200-series locomotives from Werkspoor Netherlands and passenger coaches from Westinghouse and General Electric.

The electrification project continued and on 1 May 1927, all rail lines that surround Batavia has been fully electrified. Batavia Zuid station (now Jakarta Kota) was closed temporarily in 1926, was reopened on 8 October 1929. The last part of the electrification project, Batavia Zuid – Buitenzorg, was completed in 1930. After independence in 1945, the railway operation was taken over by DKA (Djawatan Kereta Api Repoeblik Indonesia, Indonesian Railways Bureau, former name KAI).

Decline and revival 
Transportation in Jakarta was at its lowest point during the 1960s. Tramways in Jakarta were closed in 1960 and railway traffic on Manggarai – Jakarta Kota was restricted in November 1966. In 1965, a portion of railway line between Gondangdia and Sawah Besar was stripped from electrification, with remaining services on the portion now powered by steam and diesel trains. It was reported that then-President Sukarno wanted to get rid of anything that would block the view of Monas and Merdeka Square, then still under construction. After Sukarno's fall, the electrification was reconstructed and reopened in 1970.

On 16 May 1972, PNKA (Perusahaan Negara Kereta Api, successor of DKA) ordered 10 new sets of electric multiple units from Japan, leading to the revival of the electric train services within Greater Jakarta. The new trains, built by Nippon Sharyo, arrived in 1976 and replaced the old locomotives and coaches. Sets consisted of four cars each, with capacity of 134 passengers per car. Those new trains (commonly known as KRL Rheostatik) will continue serving the passengers in Jakarta for the next 37 years. PNKA (later PJKA and Perumka) continued importing trains from Japan, South Korea, Belgium and Netherlands until the late 1990s. By the 1990s, Greater Jakarta commuter rail used a mixture of EMUs and DMUs, with lines waiting for electrification used Japan-made DMUs (class MCW 302) or locomotive-hauled coaches. 

In May 2000, the government of Japan via JICA and Tokyo Metropolitan Government donated 72 units of used Toei 6000 trains, formerly operating on Toei Mita Line. These were the first air-conditioned electric trains in Indonesia. The new trains were operated on 25 August 2000 for express services.

Commuterline era 

The current form of electric train service in Jakarta was begun in 2008. Jabotabek Urban Transport Division, a sub-unit of KAI that handles commuter service around Jabodetabek, spun-off to form KAI Commuterline Jabodetabek (KCJ). Ticket revenues, rolling stock maintenance, and station management was transferred to the newly formed subsidiary, but all operational matters (e.g. scheduling and dispatching), rolling stock, stations and infrastructures remained under KAI responsibility.

The modernization of the commuter railway system, however, did not begin until 2011. Network operations were greatly simplified from 37 point-to-point service patterns into six integrated lines (known as "loop line" system) all running local, stopping at every station, as express services were abolished. Service was also simplified into two service classes: Economy class (cheaper service without air conditioning, subsidized by Ministry of Transportation) and Commuter class (more expensive service with air conditioning). On 17 April 2013, the commuter line extension to Maja in the Green Line commenced operation. On 25 July 2013, the economy class was discontinued, leaving the Commuter class as the sole service class throughout the network. In July 2013, the operator introduced the COMMET (Commuter Electronic Ticketing) system replacing the old paper ticket system and changing the old fare system into 'progressive fare' system, as well as modernization of all 80 serving stations.

Starting on 1 April 2015, the Nambo line extension operation is commenced. Three line extensions have been opened between 2015 and 2017: the extension of Pink Line to Tanjung Priuk station which commenced operation on 22 December 2015, the extension of Green Line to Rangkasbitung station which commenced operation on 1 April 2017, and the extension of Blue Line to Cikarang station which commenced operation on 8 October 2017. In July 2015, KA Commuter Jabodetabek served more than 850,000 passengers per day, which is almost triple the 2011 figures, but still less than 3.5% of all Jabodetabek commutes.

Until 5 March 2014, KA Commuter Jabodetabek only operates 8-car trainsets on all lines. In 2016, the operation of 12-car trainsets commenced. As of December 2019, it operates 1,057 trips per day by 90 trains.

Service routes
The modernization project in 2011 introduced 6 integrated commuter lines and 8 services which serve Greater Jakarta. The number of services has increased to 11 by 2017.

The network route map is recognized by color code, destination, and since recently, a station numbering system.

Ticketing and fares

Passengers may purchase ticket for single or multiple journeys. Single-journey cards, Tiket Harian Berjaminan (THB, "guaranteed daily ticket") may be purchased at any ticket counters or C-VIM vending machines, available in some stations. A Rp 10,000 deposit will be levied on top of the fare to be paid in order to prevent losses for KCI, as many passengers do not return the single-journey cards. Passengers may recharge the card for the next trip, or refund the deposit at the ticket counter or vending machines in any KRL Commuterline stations. However, if the card is not used or recharged for seven days, the card will expire and cannot be refunded.

Passengers may also purchase a card for multiple journeys, named Kartu Multi-Trip (KMT, "multitrip card"). KMT is priced at Rp 50,000 (including Rp 30,000 credit). The card has no expiry date and can be used with a minimum credit of Rp 5,000 after KCI introduced fare adjustment machines. Passengers who don't have enough credit in their KMT can top-up at fare adjustment machines or two-way ticket counters. Previously the minimum credit was Rp 13,000, based on the highest available fare in the system. The card may be topped up at the ticket counters or vending machines. Starting in October 2021 this card could also be used in other major transit systems such as MRT Jakarta, LRT Jakarta and Transjakarta

In addition to KCI-issued cards, passengers may also purchase bank-issued cards. Unlike KCI-issued cards which may only be used for public transit systems and station's park-and-ride facilities, these cards may also be used for goods and services payments at selected merchants, gas stations, TransJakarta BRT, selected parking facilities, and toll road payments. Currently Commuterline accepts Mandiri e-Money, BRIZZI, BNI TapCash, flazz BCA, and Jak Lingko.

Starting from 1 October 2019, KRL Commuterline station gates accept tickets purchased through mobility and e-wallet apps. LinkAja! was the first to implement it, followed by JakLingko and Gojek apps in 2022. It uses QR code displayed by the app on passenger's mobile phone that can be read by scanner attached inside the system. Payment with LinkAja! can be used only if the passenger's balance is not less than Rp 13,000.00, as the payment directly deducts LinkAja balance, thus having similar mechanism as multitrip card. On the other hand, passengers using JakLingko and Gojek must choose their origin and destination before obtaining the ticket, similar to single trip cards.

Fares 
Fare is charged by distance travelled ('progressive fare'), Rp 3,000 for the first 25 kilometers and Rp 1,000 for every next 10 kilometers. The fare is subsidized by the Ministry of Transportation. For instance in 2016, the government allocated Rp 1.1 trillion public service obligation to KRL Commuterline.

Prior to the introduction of distance-based fare, the fare is determined by number of stations passed. The first five stations passed is charged at Rp 3,000 and every next three stations charged at Rp 1,000. Between July and November 2013, the charges were lowered to Rp 2,000 and Rp 500 respectively, after the government subsidized the fare. Number of passengers increased by 30% after one week of introduction of the new fares.

Stations

As of January 2019, there are 80 active and 4 inactive stations for KRL Commuterline. All the stations have commercial zones of various sizes for operating retail stores, chain shops, and ATM booth. The stations have prayer place, toilets and dispensary for emergency health service. Stations have manual ticket counters as well as automated ticket vending machines since 2017. Started on 15 January 2019, all stations have free Wi-Fi service facility for passengers.

List of stations
Bold: Terminus or transit stations
Italic: Closed for Commuterline, open for intercity trains
Strikethrough: Closed for all services

List of major stations
Below are the list of main and terminus stations, some of them also serve intercity train lines.

 Currently Gambir station does not serve as KRL stop, instead focusing on intercity train services. Passengers who travel to areas near Merdeka Square, could depart at the nearby Gondangdia or Juanda stations.
 Southbound local trains (operated by KAI, serving trips from Bogor to Sukabumi/Cianjur) starts and ends from Bogor Paledang station, within walking distance from Bogor station.
 Duri Station is planned to be the transit for Airport Commuter Train, which was under construction in 2014 and started operation in 2017.
 Pasar Senen station only serve the half loop Bekasi/Cikarang-Tanah Abang commuter service, while the Full loop service does not stop here.

Rolling stock 

KRL Commuterline rolling stocks are composed of second-hand rail cars imported from Japan of Tokyo Metro, Toyo Rapid Railway, JR East (in which KAI Commuter has strategic partnerships with), and Tokyu Railways. All of these cars are legally classified as executive-class cars (K1). Domestically made air-conditioned cars produced by Industri Kereta Api (INKA) are no longer in service, although those trains will operate on Solo-Yogya commuter line in Central Java. Trains are generally formed of 8, 10, or 12 cars, with a capacity of 80–110 passengers per car. The system had 1,020 cars as of July 2019.

Train without air conditioning (mainly economy class) are no longer operated as KCI (the operator) begins the single-service operation of air-conditioned trainsets. One set of ex-economy class (Holec) has been retrofitted with air conditioning by INKA.

Toei 6000 series, which began service in 2000, was the first air-conditioned train type to be scrapped in December 2015. They are replaced by a huge influx of newer secondhand 205 series trains.

Since 1 January 2016, the ex-JR East 103 series were also retired from service.

Air-conditioned rolling stock
EMU classes mentioned as current/active by KCI on 10 March 2021:

Future air-conditioned rolling stock

Retired/suspended air-conditioned rolling stock

Non-air-conditioned rolling stock (all retired)

Incidents and accidents
 On 18 June 2011, during the trial for the new Commuterline services, angry passengers vandalized a former Tokyu 8500 series trainset number 8613F on idle at Jakarta Kota station by stoning it, damaging its crucial components, as a protest toward prolonged waiting time for regular subsidized Economy class KRL.
On Thursday, October 4, 2012, a former Tokyo Metro 05 series trainset (no. 05-007F) travelling as KA 435 derailed on a switch before Cilebut station, with the third car impacted station platform's end. No fatal injury reported, the whole trainset was later written off due to damage beyond repair.
9 December 2013 – A former Tokyo Metro 7000 series trainset (no. 7121F) travelling as KA 1131 on Serpong-Jakarta line collided with Pertamina tanker truck at Bintaro Permai railway intersection, Jakarta. Seven people (including the three train drivers) were killed in the crash. The trainset was subsequently written-off.
 23 September 2015 – Two electric trains (former 205 series trainset no. 205-54F and 205-123F) travelling as KA 1154 and KA 1156 were involved in a rear-end collision at Juanda Station. No one was killed, but 42 passengers were hurt, with some required intensive treatment. Some cars involved returned to service combined in trainset 205-54F, while the rest was written off.
 On Sunday, March 10, 2019, a former Tokyu 8500 series trainset (no. 8612F) travelling as KA 1722 on Jatinegara–Bogor line derailed between Cilebut and Bogor station. KA 1722 crashed, rolled over, and hit the LAA (overhead catenary) pole until it collapsed and the train body dented on the front side. Meanwhile, car no. 8712 and 8912 rolled over. There are no reports of casualties, the four undamaged cars were joined to trainset 8610F to form a 12-car trainset and the rest were written off.

Pre-2011 route and services reform 
The accidents mentioned below involved trains operated by KAI Commuter's predecessor systems, such as ESS (1925-1939), DKA/PNKA/PJKA Jakarta Exploitation (1945-1976), Jabotabek Urban Railway (1976-1999), and Divisi Jabotabek (1999-2011), before the introduction of standard Commuterline service in July 2011 and standard Commuterline routes in December 2011.
 On 27 June 1928, a Westinghouse EMU of the State Electric Railway (then still under Dutch East Indies colonial rule) from the direction of Kemayoran station overran the terminating tracks of (currently inactive) Batavia Noord station, hitting a horse-drawn carriage on the road beside the station. No human casualty reported 
 20 September 1968, an Economy local train hauled by class 3200 electric locomotive travelling as KA 406 to Bogor collided with another economy train (KA 309) to Jakarta near Ratu Jaya, Depok. 46 deaths and 115 injuries reported. The crash was attributed to malfunctioning indicator in the signaling system as well as lack of verification by the dispatcher.
2 November 1993, two Economy train, both of Rheostatic EMU class from 1976 and 1980s batch, running the Jakarta Kota-Bogor line on opposite directions were involved in a head on collision near Ratu Jaya, Depok around 07:30 am during the morning rush hour. 20 people were killed, including drivers of both trains, and further 100 was injured. Being the same type, 4 surviving cars from both side were combined, colloquially known as CatDog trainset. The rest were written off. This accident prompted the government to start double-tracking project of the Depok-Bogor segment of the line.
 19 August 2000, A KRL Hitachi trainset running KA 628 (Economy class) from Jakarta Kota to Tangerang was hit from behind by Indocement factory coal supply train no. KA 228 en route between Kampung Bandan and Angke stations. 3 people died on this accident including 2 train crews on both trains. The Hitachi train involved was stored for a long time afterward, before being scrapped. On a further note, Tangerang line used to continue from Duri all the way to Kota before 2011.
 18 November 2003, KRL Holec trainset KL2-94202F running KA 396 (Business) on Tanah Abang-Serpong service suffered an electrical fire ignited by overhead wire snapped by overload trigerred by failure of the trains' component before reaching Kebayoran station. The two frontmost cars of the train was engulfed in the inferno.
 4 October 2003, KRL Holec KL3-97242F travelling as KA 490 (Economy) bound for Bogor collided with the rear end of a fellow KRL Holec train KL3-94212F traveling as KA 488 (Economy) also bound for Jakarta Kota on this line between Cilebut and Bogor stations. 39 people were injured.
12 December 2003, a KRL Rheostatic trainset KL3-76112F set in idle position on Bogor station prepared for KA 459 (Economy) slid uncommanded down the line. It continues all the way until stopped by the steeper upward climb of the Manggarai-Cikini elevated track. Further investigation proved the trainset was not secured enough to prevent it to slide away from idle position.
 30 June 2005, KRL Rheostatic KL3-76110F travelling as KA 583 (Economy) bound for Jakarta Kota collided with the rear end of a KRL Holec trainset KL3-2000202F traveling as KA 585 (Economy) on this line between Tanjung Barat and Pasar Minggu stations. 5 deaths and 113 injuries reported.
 2 January 2007, KA 241 (Economy) running on Bojong Gede-Jakarta Kota service derailed while reaching track 10 of Jakarta Kota terminus station, no casualty reported.
On 18 July 2007, a KRL Holec train trainset no. KL3-97228F running KA 423 (Economy) bound for Jakarta Kota was hit from behind by a locomotive being sent to Pasar Senen to carry KA 120 Jayabaya while stopping at Pondokjati station. No injury reported. The KRL set was able to continue its journey without further incident.
On 30 October 2008, a former Toei 6000 set number 6181F train serving Bekasi to Jakarta line via Pasar Senen variant of the line (at the time being the main route for this line) as KA 421 AC Economy class train was hit from behind by Antaboga 1001 freight train on a track segment between Kemayoran and Kampung Bandan stations. Surviving cars of 6181F returned into service after another accident involving 6151F (mentioned below) opened the way to trainset reconfiguration in 2009.
 5 June 2009, KRL Holec travelling as KA 521 (Economy) bound for Jakarta Kota collided with the rear end of a former Toyo Rapid 1000 series trainset traveling as KA 265 (Express) on this line between Tebet and Manggarai stations.
 4 August 2009 – Former Toei 6000 series trainset no. 15F traveling as KA 211 (Express) collided with the rear end of KRL Holec KL3-97234F travelling as KA 549 (Economy) on between Bogor and Cilebut stations. Assistant driver and a technician on board KA 211 was killed. Some cars from KA 211 involved returned to service redistributed to other trainsets, including 6181F and shortened 4-car 6151F well until Commuterline era, while the rest (including the Holec trainset) was written off

Gallery

Rolling stock

Stations

See also

 Transport in Indonesia
 Transport in Jakarta
 Rail transport in Indonesia
 Jakarta MRT
 Jakarta LRT
 Greater Jakarta LRT
 KRL Commuterline Yogyakarta-Solo
S-Bahn

References

External links

 KAI Commuter/KRL Commuterline website 
 Jabotabek Railnews 
 KRL Jabodetabek 

Railway lines in Indonesia
Regional rail in Indonesia
Rapid transit in Indonesia
Transport in Jakarta
1500 V DC railway electrification